Karl Fritjof Rolvaag (July 18, 1913 – December 20, 1990) was an American diplomat and politician who served as the 31st governor of Minnesota from March 25, 1963, to January 2, 1967, as a member of the Democratic-Farmer-Labor (DFL) Party. He was the son of the author and professor Ole E. Rølvaag.

The 1962 election was held on November 6, but the results were not known until a 139-day recount was completed in March 1963. Rolvaag won the closest gubernatorial election in state history, defeating the incumbent, Elmer L. Andersen by 91 votes out of over 1.3 million cast. He is one of only four Minnesota Democrats to win a gubernatorial election with a Democrat in the White House.

Life and career
A native of Northfield, Minnesota, Rolvaag lived in his hometown and graduated from St. Olaf College. He then fought in World War II, rising to the rank of lieutenant and commanding a tank. After the war, he went to Norway to learn about politics before returning home to Minnesota, where he became the head of the DFL Party. In 1954, he was elected lieutenant governor. After serving in that capacity for eight years, Rolvaag mounted his successful campaign for governor in 1962.

Rolvaag was the first Minnesota governor to serve a four-year term, but due to continuous wrangling between him and the conservative-controlled legislature, there were few notable achievements during his term. He is remembered for a leadership role in bringing reform to the state's institutions for the mentally disabled, leading to improved conditions and treatment for people with developmental disabilities. Rolvaag also changed the organization of the state's junior colleges. Formerly, the local school board ran each college separately; Rolvaag designed a coordinated statewide system with the goal of putting every Minnesotan within commuting distance of an institution of higher education. He also bitterly opposed significant expansion plans by the state colleges and vocally opposed designating a second state research university.

When Rolvaag ran for reelection in 1966, his party did not endorse him, opting instead for Lieutenant Governor A. M. (Sandy) Keith. Rolvaag entered the DFL's primary with a cry of "Let the people decide!" and roundly defeated Keith. He lost to Republican nominee Harold LeVander in the November general election.

In 1967, after leaving office, Rolvaag was appointed United States Ambassador to Iceland by President Lyndon Johnson. He returned to Minnesota in 1970 and was elected to the Minnesota Public Utilities Commission. He resigned that post in 1975 in order to seek treatment for alcoholism. His alcohol addiction eventually led to the end of his 37-year marriage, but he overcame his heavy drinking in the 1980s. Rolvaag stayed out of politics the rest of his life, but helped others work through their problems with alcoholism, attending meetings and giving talks in places as nearby as his hometown of Northfield and as far off as Sweden.

Rolvaag died at his home in Northfield on December 20, 1990, aged 77, having been ill with a heart condition.

References

Sources 
 Minnesota Historical Society, Karl F. (Fritjof) Rolvaag
 The New York Times,  Ex-Gov. Karl Rolvaag, Minnesotan, 78, Dies, December 21, 1990

Papers
Correspondence, political files, subject files, personal files, news clippings, print materials, and sound and visual materials of Karl F. Rolvaag are available for research use at the Minnesota Historical Society.

|-

1913 births
1990 deaths
People from Northfield, Minnesota
Military personnel from Minnesota
American Lutherans
American people of Norwegian descent
Democratic Party governors of Minnesota
Lieutenant Governors of Minnesota
Ambassadors of the United States to Iceland
St. Olaf College alumni
20th-century American politicians
20th-century Lutherans